is a Japanese politician of the Liberal Democratic Party (LDP), a member of the House of Representatives in the Diet (national legislature).

Early life and education 
NIshimoto was born April 1, 1950, and grew up in Takaoka District, Kōchi. She graduated from Dokkyo University.

Career 
Nishimoto was elected to the village council of Hidaka, Kōchi for the first time in 1995 and to the Diet for the first time in 2005.

References 
 

Members of the House of Representatives (Japan)
Female members of the House of Representatives (Japan)
Koizumi Children
People from Kōchi Prefecture
Living people
1950 births
Liberal Democratic Party (Japan) politicians
21st-century Japanese women politicians
Dokkyo University alumni